Clare Elizabeth Taylor  (born 22 May 1965) is an English sportswoman, the first woman to have played on a World Cup team in both cricket and football. She represented England at both cricket, as a member of the winning World Cup cricket team in 1993, and football (World Cup 1995). Taylor attended Moor End High School and still has her name on the athletics records board. Taylor was the first bowler for England to take 100 wickets in WODIs.

She was appointed Member of the Order of the British Empire (MBE) in the 2000 Birthday Honours "for services to Cricket, Association Football, and to Hockey."

Football career
Taylor began playing at age 11 and after answering a Women's Football Association advert in Shoot magazine, started playing for Bronte Ladies. Her England debut came in a 2–0 defeat to Germany in Bochum on 16 December 1990.

When Bronte were relegated, Taylor moved to Knowsley United, joining in preference to the dominant Doncaster Belles because she wanted the challenge of playing for a developing club. Taylor played for Knowsley United in the 1992–93 WFA Women's National League Cup final, at Wembley, and two months later in the Cricket World Cup final at Lord's.

Knowsley United became Liverpool Ladies shortly after losing the 1994 FA Women's Cup Final to Doncaster Belles. Taylor's team, Liverpool, were also beaten in the following two seasons' FA Cup finals, by Arsenal (1995) and Croydon (1996) respectively.

During her amateur sporting career, Taylor was employed by the Royal Mail, though she noted: "The amount of time I spend away on unpaid leave has got beyond a joke." Although Taylor preferred football to cricket, she focused on cricket after being dropped from the England football team.

Cricket career

One of the best bowlers in the women's game, Taylor represented the England women's cricket team from 1988 until 2005, and was an England team member when they won the 1993 World Cup final at Lord's Cricket Ground against New Zealand.

References

External links
 
Career highlights from webbsoc.

1965 births
1995 FIFA Women's World Cup players
England women One Day International cricketers
England women Test cricketers
English women's footballers
England women's international footballers
FA Women's National League players
Liverpool F.C. Women players
Living people
Members of the Order of the British Empire
Cricketers from Huddersfield
Otago Sparks cricketers
Yorkshire women cricketers
Women's association football defenders
Bronte L.F.C. players